Hui Aloha ʻĀina  were two Hawaiian nationalist organizations (one for men and another for women) established  by Native Hawaiian political leaders and statesmen and their spouses in the aftermath of the overthrow of the Hawaiian Kingdom and Queen Liliʻuokalani on January 17, 1893. The organization was formed to promote Hawaiian patriotism and independence and oppose the overthrow and the annexation of Hawaii to the United States. Its members organized and collected the Kūʻē Petitions to oppose the annexation, which ultimately blocked a treaty of annexation in the United States Senate in 1897.

Names 
The official name according to both organizations' constitution was Ka Hui Hawaii Aloha ʻĀina (The Hawaiian Patriotic League). The two organizations have also been called Ka Hui Hawaiʻi Aloha ʻĀina o Na Kane and Ka Hui Hawaiʻi Aloha ʻĀina o Na Wahine or Ka Hui Hawaiʻi Aloha ʻĀina o Na Lede. During the funeral processions of Princess Kaʻiulani and Queen Kapiʻolani in 1899, the organizations were referred to as Ahahui Aloha Aina and Ahahui Aloha Aina o na Wahine, respectively. The word hui in both organizations' names is the Hawaiian word for a social or community group.

The Hawaiian Patriotic League was also the name of another secret organization founded between 1887 and 1893. It members included Robert William Wilcox and Volney V. Ashford.

History 
The organization was founded on March 4, 1893, two and half months after the overthrow of Queen Liliʻuokalani by pro-American forces within the kingdom who established the Provisional Government of Hawaii. The founding officers of Hui Aloha ʻĀina were Joseph Nāwahī, John Adams Cummins, John K. Kaunamano and John W. Bipikane, who were all former legislators or ministers in the Hawaiian monarchical government during the reigns of Liliʻuokalani and her predecessor King Kalākaua.

The objective of the organization was to promote Hawaiian patriotism and independence, oppose the overthrow, restore the monarchy, oppose the rule of the Provisional Government and its successor the Republic of Hawaii and oppose any attempts annexation of the Hawaiian Islands to the United States.

Nāwahī was elected president while Cummins was elected honorary president. The four vice presidents in 1893 were John E. Bush, John Lot Kaulukoʻu, Kaunamano and Bipikane. By July 1893, the organization claimed total membership of 7,500 native-born Hawaiian qualified voters (out of 13,000 registered voters) and a women's branch of over 11,000 members.

A delegation of members presented the case of the monarchy and the Hawaiian people to the United States Commissioner James Henderson Blount who was sent by President Grover Cleveland to investigate the overthrow.

After Nāwahī's death in September 1896, delegates from the different island branches of Hui Aloha ʻĀina met in Honolulu for the election of a new leadership council on November28, 1896, which coincided with Lā Kūʻokoʻa (Hawaiian Independence Day). In this meeting, James Keauiluna Kaulia was elected as the new president and William Pūnohu White as honorary president. Vice presidents elected were Kaunamano, Bipikane, Bush, and Edward Kamakau Lilikalani.

In anticipation of a new vote on an annexation treaty supported by President William McKinley, Hui Aloha ʻĀina and other Hawaiian nationalist groups collected the Kūʻē Petitions to oppose the treaties ratification in the United States Senate. Members of Hui Aloha ʻĀina for Men and Hui Aloha ʻĀina for Women collected over 21,000 signatures across the island chain opposing annexation in 1897. Another 17,000 signatures were collected by members of Hui Kālaiʻāina but not submitted to the Senate because those signatures were also asking for restoration of the monarchy. These were submitted by a commission of Native Hawaiian delegates consisting of Kaulia, David Kalauokalani (president of Hui Kālaiʻāina), William Auld, and John Richardson to the United States government. The petitions collectively were presented as evidence of the strong grassroots opposition of the Hawaiian community to annexation, and the treaty was defeated in the Senate.

However, a year following the defeat of the treaty in the Senate, Hawaii was annexed via the Newlands Resolution, a joint resolution of Congress, in July 1898. This was done shortly after the outbreak of the Spanish–American War and necessitated by the strategic position of Hawaii as a Pacific military base.

In May 1895, Joseph Nāwahī and Emma Nāwahī also founded Ke Aloha Aina, a weekly anti-annexationist newspaper written in the Hawaiian language to promote Hawaiian independence and opposition to American annexation. The paper ran from 1895 until 1920.

Women's branch 

A corresponding women's organization named Hui Aloha ʻĀina o Na Wahine (Hawaiian Women's Patriotic League) was founded on March 27, 1893 by Emilie Widemann Macfarlane, the part-Hawaiian daughter of Hermann A. Widemann. Martha Widemann Berger (Macfarlane's sister) and Abigail Kuaihelani Campbell were elected vice-presidents. Honorary presidents included Mary Robinson Foster, Elizabeth Kekaʻaniau Pratt, Rebecca Kahalewai Cummins, Bathsheba Robinson Allen, and Irene ʻĪʻī Brown Holloway.

On April 17, Macfarlane and a small group of younger Hawaiian women resigned their positions, after a dispute arose between two factions of the group over the wordings to the memorial seeking the restoration of the monarchy to be presented to the United States Commissioner James Henderson Blount sent by President Grover Cleveland to investigate the overthrow. The organization elected Campbell as the organization's next president.
Emma Nāwahī was also a founding member.

On April 18, an executive body of seven members: Campbell, Nāwahi, Rebecca Kahalewai Cummins, Mary Ann Kaulalani Parker Stillman, Jessie Kapaihi Kaae, Hattie K. Hiram, Laura Kekupuwolui Mahelona submitted a petition to Commissioner Blount.

Dissolution and legacy 
The organization merged with Hui Aloha ʻĀina to form the Hawaiian Home Rule Party in 1900. Kalauokalani was elected president and Kaulia as vice-president of the new political party.

In 1996, historian Noenoe K. Silva discovered the 21,269 signatures of the Kūʻē Petitions by Hui Aloha ʻĀina in the National Archives in Washington, DC, but the whereabout of the original Hui Kālaiʻāina petition remains unknown.

Delegates of Hui Aloha ʻĀina, 1893 
This list is not a complete list of all delegates or officers of Hui Aloha ʻĀina:
Hawaii

Maui

Molokai

Oahu

Kauai

Members in 1893 photograph

References

Bibliography 

Hawaiian Kingdom
Hawaiiana
Hawaii culture
1893 establishments
1900 disestablishments
Native Hawaiian nationalist parties
Monarchist organizations